The Wales Coast Path is a designated long-distance trail which follows, or runs close to, the coastline of Wales.

The Wales Coast Path runs through eleven national nature reserves and other nature reserves such as those managed by the Royal Society for the Protection of Birds and The Wildlife Trusts.

History and development
Plans for the new all-Wales coastal path were first unveiled by First Minister Rhodri Morgan in June 2006, when he officially opened the  route around Anglesey. It was anticipated that the Wales Coast Path project, which would improve access and link up existing paths, would take up to five years; it has been nearer six.

The idea for the path was developed from a desire to build upon the economic success of the Pembrokeshire Coast Path and the Isle of Anglesey Coastal Path. Both coastal paths were considered as major contributors to the visitor economy of Wales, and in addition to financial benefits it was also seen as an important initiative in encouraging both locals and visitors to discover and enjoy outdoor spaces, and in the health and welfare benefits that such paths provide.

The Wales Coast Path was officially launched on 5 May 2012. Earlier in the same year, Lonely Planet had rated the coast of Wales first in its Best in Travel: top 10 regions for 2012.

The Wales Coast Path was developed by the Welsh Government in partnership with the former Countryside Council for Wales, sixteen local authorities, and two National Parks. The total cost of the project was £14.6 million. A book published in 2016 stated that in a single year (2013), "it had paid its startup cost twice over" due to a massive increase in revenue generated by tourism.  A March 2023 report indicated that the financial benefits were continuing. 

Since 2007, the Welsh Government had been invested in improving public access to the coast of Wales through its Access Improvement Programme. In addition to this funding of approximately £2 million per year from the Welsh Government and the coastal local authorities, the European Regional Development Fund has additionally allocated nearly £3.9 million over three years in support of the project.

The Countryside Council for Wales supervised the project and has said that improvements to the quality and alignment of the route would continue during 2012 and 2013 to ensure that the path follows the Welsh coastline as close as it is safe and practical. Improvements have continued since, with examples including the removal of a 10-mile detour inland following the opening of the rebuilt Gwynedd's Pont Briwet bridge in 2015 and the creation of a new right-of-way between Y Felinheli and Bangor in 2018.

Over time, the completed path is expected to lead to the creation of circular coastal routes, as links to inland towns and villages are improved.

Description
Heralded as the world's first coastal path to cover an entire country, the Wales Coast Path follows the Welsh coastline from Chepstow, Monmouthshire, in the south to Queensferry, Flintshire, in the north. Many parts already had established paths, such as the North Wales Path, the Anglesey Coastal Path and the Llŷn Coastal Path. The Pembrokeshire Coast Path had been a designated National Trail, and in 2011 was voted by National Geographic magazine as the second-best coastal destination in the world.

The whole path is accessible to walkers and, where practical, some sections are suitable for cyclists, families with pushchairs, people with restricted mobility, and horse riders.

The Wales Coast Path is not a National Trail although it does  link with the Offa's Dyke Path, which loosely follows the Wales–England border. Together they make a  continuous walking route around almost the whole of Wales.

Overall responsibility for establishing the path lay with the Countryside Council for Wales (now Natural Resources Wales), but management on the ground rests with the 15 local government areas it passes through. Five waymarked long-distance coast paths were already established, in Pembrokeshire, Anglesey, Gwynedd, Ceredigion and the northern coast of Wales. These formed the basis for five of the eight geographical sections that now make up the path. The remaining three areas are made up of single and combined counties and county boroughs with coastlines.

Since 2012, Wales Coast Path in North Wales follows part of the Reading to Holyhead National Cycle Route 5.

Sections
The Wales Coast path website divides the  coast route into sections with an accompanying map. These are (from north to south):

The opening

The official opening of the path took place in a number of locations on 5 May 2012, highlighting the path's beauty and ease of access for walkers of all ages, fitness and ability. To help celebrate the opening, Ramblers Cymru hosted the Big Welsh Coastal Walk, one of the largest mass-participation events ever seen in Wales.

The Countryside Council for Wales asked Chester-based outdoor specialists Northern Eye Books to create the official guidebooks for five of the seven main sections of the Wales Coast Path: North Wales Coast, Isle of Anglesey, Llyn Peninsula, Carmarthenshire and Gower, and the South Wales Coast. They already publish the Official Guide for Anglesey, Walking the Isle of Anglesey Coastal Path by Carl Rogers. The remaining titles were due for publication in late 2012 and 2013. There were existing guides to the Ceredigion Coast Path and the Pembrokeshire Coast Path by other publishers.

The first anniversary of the opening of the path was marked on radio and television, and it is estimated that in that first year some 2.8 million people walked stretches of the path, contributing £16 million to the Welsh economy. Further to this, it is estimated that more than 800,000 visitors to the path also stayed the night in one of the many guest-houses, B&Bs and hotels along the route.

Controversy
The Open Spaces Society has criticised some landowners who do not allow the path onto their coastal land. This means more than 20% of the route is on roads, sometimes out of sight of the sea. In response, a Countryside Council for Wales spokeswoman said: "Just over 20% of the WCP is on road, slightly less than the average for national trails in Britain, which is in the region of 25%. This is mainly on quiet, country lanes."

There is currently a temporary road route north of Cardigan, connecting Gwbert with Mwnt; the actual Ceredigion Coast Path section within that vicinity is currently unavailable because of legal proceedings.

Walkers have a view overlooking a gypsy caravan site at Rover Way in Cardiff. During the development of the footpath, the occupants expressed concerns over privacy.

See also
 List of places along Wales Coast Path
 Long-distance footpaths in Wales
 England Coast Path
 Scottish Coastal Way
 Long-distance footpaths in the United Kingdom

References

External links 

 Wales Coast Path - official website
 WalkingClub.org.uk - Wales Coast Path
 Wales Trails - cycle around Wales
 Countryside Council for Wales
 Natural Resources Wales
 YouTube footage of part of the Wales Coast Path

Coastal paths in Wales
Long-distance footpaths in Wales
Tourist attractions in Wales
2012 establishments in Wales
2012 in the environment
2012 in Wales